Dota Underlords is a 2020 auto battler game developed and published by Valve. The game is based on a popular Dota 2 community-created game mode called Dota Auto Chess, which was released in January 2019. Dota Underlords first released in early access in June 2019 before officially releasing on February 25, 2020, for Android, iOS, macOS, Linux, and Windows. The game is free to play and features cross-platform play.

Gameplay
Dota Underlords is an auto battler, a chess-inspired competitive strategy game, where players place characters, known as heroes, on an 8x8 grid-shaped battlefield. After a preparation phase, a team's heroes then automatically fight the opposing team without any further direct input from the player. A match features up to eight players online who take turns playing against each other in a one-on-one format, with the winner being the final player standing after eliminating all of the opposing heroes. In addition to the online matchmaking, single-player matches against bots is also featured, as well as a "freestyle" practice mode that puts no limits on hero combinations. Over the course of a match, players earn gold and experience points, which are used to upgrade heroes and other playable units to make them stronger. Players also make use of items, which give stat bonuses to units. The game also features a "duos" mode, allowing two players on separate boards, but sharing health and levels, to perform as a team, with the winning duo having the best combined damage totals by the end.

Development and release
Dota Underlords was developed and published by Valve for Android, iOS, macOS, Linux, and Windows. It is based on Dota Auto Chess, a popular community created game mode within Dota 2, a game they also developed. Following Dota Auto Chess release in January 2019, it quickly became a phenomenon, having over seven million players by April 2019, Valve had met with the mod's developers, the Chinese-based Drodo Studio, to discuss directly collaborating on a standalone version. However, the two companies were unable to come to an agreement, with them both stating that it was in their best interest to develop their own separate games, with Dota Underlords being Valve's project. The game was built using Valve's Source 2 game engine, making it the first game using that engine to be released on mobile platforms.

Valve announced Dota Underlords in May 2019, with it releasing in early access as a free-to-play game on June 20, 2019. where it saw over 1.5 million downloads and held a concurrent player count on Steam of over 200,000 within a few days. Features such as a replay system, ranked matchmaking, daily challenges and rewards, and a battle pass were added over time during its early access phase before it officially released on February 25, 2020. It features full cross-platform play between its PC and mobile versions, with players able to freely start games on one and finish it on another.

Reception

Polygon called it a clone of Dota Auto Chess, stating that while they thought Underlords was more appealing to new players, the many similarities to the original mod could make it hard for veterans of the genre to see a reason to play Underlords over it. Critics also compared and contrasted it with Artifact, another Valve-developed Dota spinoff game released around the same time that was seen as unsuccessful, as well as Teamfight Tactics, the League of Legends take on the genre. IGN considered Underlords to be the easiest auto battler to get into as a novice due in part to its user interface.

References

External links 
 

2020 video games
Android (operating system) games
Auto battler video games
Dota
Esports games
Fantasy video games
Free online games
Free-to-play video games
IOS games
Linux games
Lua (programming language)-scripted video games
MacOS games
Multiplayer and single-player video games
Strategy video games
Source 2 games
Valve Corporation games
Video games containing battle passes
Video games developed in the United States
Video games with cross-platform play
Windows games